Joshua Weiner (born 1963 Boston) is an American poet.

Life
He graduated from Northwestern University, and earned his Ph.D in English and American Literature at the  University of California, Berkeley.
He served as the writing coordinator at the Fine Arts Work Center in Provincetown, and as a visiting assistant professor at Northwestern University.

He lives in Washington, D.C. with his wife, the novelist Sarah Blake, and two sons, and teaches literature and poetry workshops at University of Maryland, College Park, where he is Professor of English. He is also the poetry editor of Tikkun magazine.

His work has appeared in Best American Poetry, the Nation, the American Scholar, New York Review of Books, Chicago Tribune, Threepenny Review, TriQuarterly, Chicago Review, Boston Review, B O D Y, Yale Review, Slate, The New Republic, and other journals.

Awards
 2000 Witter Bynner Fellowship
 2002 Whiting Award
 2003  Rome Prize in Literature from the American Academy and Institute of Arts and Letters
 2012-2013 Amy Lowell Poetry Travelling Scholarship
 2014 Guggenheim Memorial Foundation Fellowship

Works
 "Found Letter", Poetry Foundation
 "Shame", Poetry, January 2006
 "The Dog State", Boston Review

Essays
 "Canon Fodder: A highly personal list", Poetry Foundation

Editor

Review
I've always been impressed by Joshua Weiner's formal intelligence and his sure knowledge of how to make a poem. He's learned as much from Mina Loy, Robert Duncan, and Tom McGrath as he has from Thom Gunn, Thomas Hardy, and George Herbert. His poems are open to many different kinds of aesthetic approaches, including those of jazz and the blues. Like the modernists, he's embraced the past, but unlike some of them, he's alert to the formal possibilities lurking in popular culture. Among the squares, he is hip; among the hip, he is wary. So watch out. His poems are tonal land mines.

References

External links
 Official website
Profile at The Whiting Foundation
 "A Conversation with Joshua Weiner", Blackbird
 "Interview with Joshua Weiner", Library of Congress

American male poets
UC Berkeley College of Letters and Science alumni
Northwestern University faculty
University of Maryland, College Park faculty
Living people
1963 births
21st-century American poets
Northwestern University alumni
Poets from Washington, D.C.
21st-century American male writers